The following lists events in the year 2017 in Mauritania.

Incumbents
President: Mohamed Ould Abdel Aziz
Prime Minister: Yahya Ould Hademine

Events

August
5 August - Mauritanians vote on the constitutional referendum to abolish the Senate and add red bands to the flag. Criticism of President Aziz's attempts at suppressing opposition also arises.

7 August - Results from the constitutional referendum show that 85% of Mauritanian voters want to abolish the Senate with a turnout of 53.73%.

Deaths
5 May – Ely Ould Mohamed Vall, political and military figure, president 2005–2007 (b. 1953).

References

 
2010s in Mauritania
Years of the 21st century in Mauritania
Mauritania
Mauritania